The Salvation Army War College was an incarnational discipleship training school established in 2003 by Founders Majors Stephen Court and Danielle Strickland, along with Pioneers Captains Ruth and Ian Gillingham. The War College began in Vancouver, British Columbia, Canada.  In 2006 a War College campus was opened in Charlotte, North Carolina, United States by Death and Glory Alumni Heather and Rob Dolby and in 2008 another in Chicago Illinois, United States by Envoys Jen and Josh Polanco.

About
The War College is a one-year (including three three-month semesters and one two-month deployment) incarnational, biblically-based, urban missions training college.

The mission statement of The War College is "to equip and enlist warriors to win the world for Jesus."

The Salvation Army endorses The War College on divisional, territorial and international structural schemes in personnel, finances and curriculum.

In Vancouver, students live primarily in The Empress Hotel, a 77 unit slum hotel at the Main and Hastings intersection in Vancouver's Downtown Eastside. The Downtown Eastside of Vancouver is known for its addiction, poverty and prostitution rates. Students who attend The War College identify themselves with the poor and immerse themselves in the neighbourhood.

Students continuing their formation may select an Associate of Practical Ministry degree and continue with The War College in its Phase Two option.

The 24-7 Prayer Movement endorses and refers their pilgrims to fulfil their discipleship and training endeavours with The Salvation Army through The War College.

Curriculum
100 Level Spiritual Basics Courses
 SB 101 Basic Disciplines
 SB 102 Basic Training II
 SB 103 Basic Warfare
 SB 104 The Salvation War on the Postmodern Front
 SB 105 The Faces Of A Warrior: Perspectives in Leadership
 SB107 Who is Jesus?
 SB108 Biblical Interpretation

200 Level Spiritual Disciplines Courses
 SD 201 Spiritual Disciplines
 SD 202 Extreme Prophetic
 SD 203 Multiplication Practicum
 SD 204 Warfare Worship
 SD 206 Extreme Warfare Survey
 SD 207 Warfare Communications

300 Level Spiritual Warfare Courses
 SW 301 Extreme Evangelism
 SW 302 Extreme Holiness
 SW 303 Be a Hero 
 SW 304 Special Operations
 SW 305 The Salvation War on the Post-modern Front
 SW 306 Advanced Warfare Research
 SW 307 Colloquium in Warfare Science

There are modular courses that vary by year.

A list of the above courses can be found here.

Board of Reference/Faculty
The Board of Reference features established leaders from around the world. These people offer insight, spiritual support and endorse The War College.  The Board of Reference is reforming and will be announced mid-June 2010.
 
The War College local and/or visiting faculty include: Jonathan Evans, Carla Evans, Aaron White, Cherie White, Major Doug Burr, Michael Collins, Major Winn Blackman, Faytene Kryskow, Patricia King, Commissioners Marilyn and William Francis and Nicole Brindle (a full list can be found in the reference).

Phase Two
Upon graduation, students can apply for a second or third year with The War College.

Phase 1: (initial War College year)
  Who am I in Christ, who is Christ in me?
  How have I been created, shaped, inculturated?
  How do I engage with God? How have I been taught to?
  How do I engage with Scripture? Prayer? Worship?
  What do Community, Justice, and Mission mean?
  What do I do about sin and discipline?
  How do I engage with the World? How might my worldview be shaped? Is it Biblical?
  Ethically, how am I to live? What in the world is based on Biblically ethical, which is not?

Phase 2a:
  Who is YHWH (Trinity) and what is Trinitarian Community?
  How has YHWH revealed himself as Father/Spirit/Son?
  What does it mean to be adopted as Kingdom children?
  What are the Spiritual Streams / Disciplines?
  How do we live as a community that is inspired and indwelt by the Trinity?
  What do Justice and Mission look like in the light of the Trinity?
  How do I grow deeper in contemplative prayer and worship?

Phase 2b:
  Who is YHWH creating me to be?
 What dreams has YHWH put in me to see brought to fruition?
 How do I exercise my giftings in community?
 How do I lead?
 Where is YHWH planting me?

Battle School
Battle School students select core basics each term. They will not be required to live in residence and the application process is the same. The cost is adjusted accordingly (which is either training only or training and meals). There is access to most War College scheduled events.

War College sessions
Blood and Fire (2010–2011)
War Cry (2009–2010)
Conquerors (2008–2009)
Incendiary (2007–2008)
Revolution (2006–2007)
Holy _ (2005–2006)
Martyrs (2004–2005)
Death and Glory (2003–2004)

See also
The Salvation Army, Canada

References

External links
 The Salvation Army War College
 Army Barmy
 24/7 Prayer
 Journal of Aggressive Christianity

The Salvation Army